The Montgomery County Public Libraries (MCPL) is the public library system for residents of Montgomery County, Maryland. The system includes 21 publicly accessible branches and a public kiosk, as well as a branch in the Montgomery County Correctional facility.

History
Library service in Montgomery County started in 1869 when a group of Rockville and other area residents assembled in the County Courthouse to plan a joint stock library. Other independent libraries were formed in Montgomery County in the following years. For example, in 1893 a group of private citizens in Kensington established the Noyes Library. From 1893 until 1950, independent public or subscriber funded libraries provided limited services to residents of southern Montgomery County. Nine independent library associations operated facilities located in Bethesda, Four Corners, Gaithersburg, Garrett Park, Kensington, Rockville, Sherwood, Silver Spring, and Wheaton.

In 1945 the Maryland Legislature passed the State Library Law which provided matching state funds for County library systems, based on a County's population. On May 31, 1950, the Montgomery County Council passed the County Library Law of 1950, which created a Department of Public Libraries administered by a professional librarian and advised by a Library Board. George B. Moreland was hired as the first Director of the Library System. The Library Board was appointed by the County Council and assumed its duties in February 1951.

By July 1, 1951, when the Department officially began its operations, seven of the nine independent Montgomery County libraries agreed to hand over administrative control to the new system in exchange for improved library service. Remaining independent meant that a library would have to operate from individual subscriptions, donations and fundraising, whereas joining the county system meant that it would receive county funds. The Library System began operation with properties and administrative control of seven formerly independent libraries, including Four Corners, Gaithersburg, Garrett Park, Noyes, Sherwood, Silver Spring, and Wheaton. The Bethesda Library Association transferred its facility and collections to the County on July 1, 1952, but the Rockville Library Association did not follow suit until July 1, 1957.

Today Montgomery County Public Libraries (MCPL) consists of 21 branches. MCPL also provides services at the Montgomery County Correctional Facility.

Governance
MCPL is a Montgomery County government agency. The current Director of Public Libraries is Anita Vassallo.

The Public Libraries' operating budget is included in the County budget process. The approved operating budget for fiscal year 2020 (July 2019–June 2020) is US$43,964,563. This includes money for physical and electronic collections and databases, staff, and programs. Public Libraries employees are County employees. For Fiscal Year 2020, the approved budget included 232 full-time and 210 part-time positions. In 2021, it was reported that librarians in the library system had formed a union.

In 2016, the MCPL released a new strategic plan for Fiscal Years 2017-2020, which includes four core aspects:
 Literate Montgomery: Emphasizing aspects of literacy for children and adults, Early Literacy, English Language Literacy, Health Literacy, Digital Literacy, Financial Literacy and Environmental Literacy.
 Connected Montgomery: Emphasizing diversity in programs and services, reaching customers, increasing civic engagement, and providing collaborative spaces.
 Strong and Vibrant Montgomery: Emphasizing job and workforce readiness and support for small businesses
 Delighted Montgomery: Emphasizing improvements to spaces, a focus on customer service and programs, relevant technologies and partnerships, and supporting staff recognition and development.

The Public Libraries has a Library Board made up of twelve members appointed by the County Executive and one representing the School Board. The Board makes recommendations to the County Executive on library-related issues, including facilities, collection, service areas, and personnel. The Library Board has twenty-three Library Advisory Committees, subcommittees representing individual branches or programs. Members of the LACs are approved by the Board.

Branches

The following MCPL branches are open to the public:
 Aspen Hill Library
 Chevy Chase Library
 Connie Morella Library (formerly Bethesda)
 Damascus Library
 Davis Library (North Bethesda)
 Gaithersburg Library
 Germantown Library
 Kensington Park Library
 Little Falls Library (Bethesda)
 Long Branch Library (Silver Spring/Takoma Park)
 Maggie Nightingale Library (formerly Poolesville)
 Marilyn J. Praisner Library (formerly Fairland)
 Noyes Library for Young Children (Kensington)
 Olney Library
 Potomac Library
 Quince Orchard Library
 Rockville Memorial Library
 Brigadier General Charles E. McGee Library
 Twinbrook Library
 Wheaton Library (co-located within the Wheaton Library and Community Recreation Center)
 White Oak Library

MCPL operates a Capital Improvement Program that calls for branches to be updated on an accelerated timetable through refresh projects. Two to three libraries per year are closed for several months to complete these projects. The Refresh program allows for technological and other updates on an accelerated timetable from the previous 25 year renovation cycle. The refresh program was recognized with the 2016 Top Innovator Award from the Urban Libraries Council.

In addition to publicly accessible branches, MCPL operates a branch at the Montgomery County Correctional Facility.

Services 
MCPL offers a wide variety of services to the public. These include physical and electronic book checkouts, magazines and e-magazines, audiobooks in various formats, and access to movie and television shows. Services in branches include internet computer access and Wi-Fi connection. Some branches offer specialized graphic design software. Printing and copying services are also available. Librarians are available at every branch to help customers find the books, information, and resources they need. MCPL also offers online information services through its  and  services.

In addition, MCPL offers a variety of programs aimed at children, teens, adults, and seniors. Programs cover a range of educational and other topics. Examples of programs include: storytimes and STEAM (Science, Technology, Engineering, Arts, and Math) skills programs for children; coding, writing, and financial literacy programs for teens; book discussion groups and job searching programs for adults; and health, art and financial planning programs for seniors.

MCPL also offers an Outreach Team that can visit community events to share information about services and sign individuals up for library cards.

Privileges 
The library system is part of the Maryland Consolidated Library System, which provides that any person who is a resident of the State of Maryland may obtain a library card at no charge at any county library or Baltimore City. This privilege is also available to non-residents who work for an employer in Maryland or pay property taxes there. A person may apply for a card from any library system in the state, or choose to authorize a card from any other library system in the state on that system.

Anyone who lives, works, pays property taxes, or goes to school in Maryland, or who lives in the District of Columbia, or in Alexandria, Arlington, Falls Church, Fairfax, Loudoun, or Prince William Counties in Northern Virginia is eligible for a free MCPL card. There is no age limit to get an MCPL card. With an MCPL card, customers can borrow materials, download ebooks, eaudiobooks, movies, and music; use research databases and online learning tools; and much more. A MCPL card can be applied for in person at any branch with a proof of address and a photo ID. Customers can apply online for a digital card to access eBooks and some databases and other eResources.  They must apply in person for full library privileges, including checking out and placing holds on physical materials.  Anyone who does not qualify for a free MCPL card can apply for a MCPL Nonresident card which is $10.00 a year and non-refundable.

Nearby public library systems
 Alexandria Public Library
 Arlington Public Library
 District of Columbia Public Library
 Howard County Public Library
 Fairfax County Public Library
 Prince George's County Memorial Library System

See also

 Culture of Maryland

References

External links

 
 Friends of the Library, Montgomery County

Library
Public libraries in Maryland
Montgomery County, Maryland
Libraries established in 1950
1950 establishments in Maryland